Punarjanma may refer to:

 Punarjanma (1932 film), a Bengali-language film directed by Premankur Atorthy
 Punarjanma (1938 film), a Hindi-language film directed by Ramnik Desai
 Punarjanma (1963 film), a Telugu-language film directed by Kotayya Pratyagatma
 Punarjanma (1969 film), a Kannada-language film directed by Peketi Shivaram

See also
 Punar Janmam, a 1961Tamil-language film directed by R. S. Mani
 Punarjanmam, a 1972 Malayalam-language film directed by K. S. Sethumadhavan